Carlos Favier Soca  (born 24 January 1969) is a former Uruguayan footballer.

Club career
Soca played for Argentinos Juniors and Racing Club de Avellaneda in the Primera División de Argentina. He also played for Juventude in the 1999 Copa do Brasil.

International career
Soca made one appearance for the senior Uruguay national football team, a 1994 FIFA World Cup qualifier against Venezuela on 29 August 1993. After 37 minutes he was substituted by Cesilio de los Santos.

References

1969 births
Living people
Uruguayan footballers
Uruguay international footballers
Uruguayan expatriate footballers
Club Nacional de Football players
Peñarol players
Argentinos Juniors footballers
Racing Club de Avellaneda footballers
Esporte Clube Juventude players
Argentine Primera División players
Footballers from Montevideo
Expatriate footballers in Argentina
Expatriate footballers in Brazil
Association football defenders